Grafton Township is located in McHenry County, Illinois. As of the 2010 census, its population was 53,137 and it contained 17,922 housing units. Grafton Township includes portions of Huntley, Lake in the Hills, Algonquin, Crystal Lake, and Lakewood.

Geography

Demographics

References

External links
City-data.com
Illinois State Archives

Townships in McHenry County, Illinois
Algonquin, Illinois
Townships in Illinois